Ana Fernández Nieto (born 3 March 2000) is a Spanish footballer who plays as a defender for Granadilla.

Club career
Fernández started her career at Atlético Madrid's academy.

References

External links
Profile at La Liga

2000 births
Living people
Women's association football defenders
Spanish women's footballers
Footballers from Madrid
Atlético Madrid Femenino players
Madrid CFF players
Primera División (women) players
Segunda Federación (women) players